The Roland D.VI was a German fighter aircraft built at the end of World War I. It lost a fly-off to the Fokker D.VII, but production went ahead anyway as insurance against problems with the Fokker.

Design and development
The Roland D.VI was designed by the Luft-Fahrzeug-Gesellschaft (L.F.G.), (whose aircraft were made under the trade name "Roland" after 1914 to avoid confusion with the Luftverkehrsgesellschaft m.b.H (L.V.G.)) late in 1917, with the prototype being the 1000th aircraft to be built by L.F.G., first flying in November 1917. The D.VI was a single bay biplane which discarded the L.F.G.-Roland patented Wickelrumpf (literally "wrapped body"), or semi-monocoque fuselage, constructed with two layers of thin plywood strips, diagonally wrapped around a male form to create a "half-shell", that used in previous L.F.G aircraft such as the Roland C.II, D.I and D.II in favour of the equally unusual (for aircraft use) Klinkerrumpf (or clinker-built) construction where the fuselage was built of overlapping thin strips of spruce over a light wooden framework. Visibility for the pilot was good, while the aircraft had above average manoeuvrability.

Operational history
 
In January 1918, two D.VIs were entered into the first fighter competition held by Idflieg at Adlershof, one powered by a 160 hp (119 kW) Mercedes D.III engine and the other by a Benz Bz.IIIa of similar power and, like the Mercedes, another upright, inline, six cylinder engine .  Although the winner of the competition was the cheaper Fokker D.VII, orders were placed for the Roland as insurance against production problems with the Fokker.

A total of 350 were built, 150 D.VIas powered by the Mercedes, while the remaining 200 were powered by the Benz and were called D.VIb.  Deliveries started in May 1918, with 70 D.VIs in frontline service on 31 August 1918.

The only surviving artifact of the LFG Roland D.VI still existing in the 21st century is the complete fuselage of a D.VIb, displaying IdFlieg military serial number 2225/18, on display at the Polish Aviation Museum in Kraków, Poland.

Operators

 Czechoslovak Air Force

Luftstreitkräfte
Kaiserliche Marine
Freikorps

Specifications (Roland D.VIb)

See also

Notes

Bibliography

 Gray, Peter and Owen Thetford. German Aircraft of the First World War. London: Putnam, 1962.
 Gray, Peter Laurence. German Aircraft of the First World War. Garden City, N.Y.: Doubleday & Co., 1970.
 Green, William and Gordon Swanborough. The Complete Book of Fighters. New York: Smithmark, 1994. .

External links

The L.F.G Roland D.VIa
Performance tests of Roland D.VIb with 200 hp Benz

1910s German fighter aircraft
D.VI
Aircraft first flown in 1917